Foussana is a town and commune in the Kasserine Governorate, Tunisia. As of 2004 it had a total population of 41249; in 5622 the urban area and 35627 in the rural. Foussana is located in the west of Kasserine Governorate, on the border with Algeria. The city was established on April 18, 1975.

See also
List of cities in Tunisia

References

Populated places in Kasserine Governorate
Communes of Tunisia